Klüver–Bucy syndrome is a syndrome resulting from bilateral lesions of the medial temporal lobe (including amygdaloid nucleus). Klüver–Bucy syndrome may present with compulsive eating, hypersexuality, insertion of inappropriate objects in the mouth (hyperorality), visual agnosia, and docility. Klüver–Bucy syndrome is more commonly found in rhesus monkeys, where the condition was first documented, than in humans. Pathology on the syndrome is still controversial with Norman Geschwind's theory and Muller theory offering different explanations for the condition. Treatment for Klüver–Bucy syndrome is minimal with no current cure.

Symptoms

The list of symptoms generally include the following:
 Docility, characterized by exhibiting diminished fear responses or reacting with unusually low aggression. This has also been termed "placidity" or "tameness".
 Dietary changes and hyperphagia, characterized by eating inappropriate objects (pica), or overeating, or both.
 Hyperorality, described by Ozawa et al. as "an oral tendency, or compulsion to examine objects by mouth".
 Hypersexuality, characterized by a heightened libido or a tendency to seek sexual stimulation from unusual or inappropriate objects.
 Visual agnosia, characterized by an inability to recognize familiar objects or people.

While this cluster of syndromes is common to such sources as 1997's The Neuropsychiatry of Limbic and Subcortical Disorders, 2005's Functional Neuroanatomy: Text and Atlas and 1997's "Single-Photon Emission CT and MR Findings in Klüver-Bucy after Reye syndrome", an article in the American Journal of Neuroradiology, the three vary thereafter.

Inconsistent criteria include:
 Hypermetamorphosis, characterized by Ozawa et al. as "an irresistible impulse to notice and react to everything within sight". This is included under the classification systems described by The Neuropsychiatry of Limbic and Subcortical Disorders and "Single-Photon Emission CT and MR Findings in Klüver-Bucy".
 Lack of emotional response, diminished emotional affect. This is a symptom under The Neuropsychiatry of Limbic and Subcortical Disorders and is included under "Single-Photon Emission CT and MR Findings in Klüver-Bucy" along with apathy under docility.
 Amnesia, characterised by an inability to recall memories. This only occurs when the damage extends bilaterally into the hippocampus.

Pathology 
There are a few theories that attempt to explain the processes behind Klüver–Bucy syndrome and its symptoms. This topic still remains controversial as complete Klüver–Bucy syndrome is rare in humans especially compared to monkeys. Klüver–Bucy syndrome is thought to occur from damage to temporal sections of the limbic networks, which connects to other structures that regulate emotional behavior.Norman Geschwind's theory states that Klüver–Bucy syndrome is caused by disconnect syndrome (a condition of the brain where the two hemispheres develop separately or at different rates) and that the initial contributor for this is the blockage of visual input to the limbic circuit. Another theory, called Muller theory, attributes Klüver–Bucy syndrome to the disconnection of pathways used for emotional regulation and memory, such as those connecting the dorsomedial thalamus to the prefrontal cortex. The medial temporal sections of the limbic system can be associated with more primitive functions such as reproduction, food, and defence. This can be seen in the symptoms of increased hypersexuality, hyperorality, and general aggression.

In rhesus monkeys 
As part of an investigation by Heinrich Klüver in the 1930s into the area affected by mescaline, Klüver arranged to have the temporal lobes of a number of rhesus monkeys bilaterally removed by Paul Bucy, a neurosurgeon. Klüver did not find the expected impact in response to mescaline, but did observe a series of changes in the subject animals. The six points of difference that Klüver recorded were visual agnosia, an increased tendency to explore items by mouth, hypermetamorphosis, dampening of emotional expression, altered sexual behavior and differences in diet. Klüver later discovered similar observations by Sanger Brown and Edward Albert Sharpey-Schafer that had been published in 1881 and drew on these to substantiate his own observations.

Monkeys in the Klüver-Bucy experiment evidently had normal vision and motor skills, but exhibited "psychic blindness", what Rusiko Bourtchouladze described in 2004 as an inability to recognize "the emotional importance of events". They did not display fear for items that would ordinarily frighten members of their species; they displayed an appetite for improper foods such as rocks or live rats and sought intercourse with unusual partners, including members of other species. They became extremely interested in exploring items in their environment and became placid when approached.

In humans
Klüver–Bucy syndrome was first documented among certain humans who had experienced temporal lobectomy in 1955 by H. Terzian and G.D. Ore. It was first noted in a human with meningoencephalitis in 1975 by Marlowe et al. Klüver–Bucy syndrome can manifest after either of these (lobectomies can be medically required by such reasons as accidents or tumors), but may also appear in humans with acute herpes simplex encephalitis or following a stroke. Other conditions may also contribute to a diagnosis of Klüver–Bucy syndrome, including Pick's disease, Alzheimer's disease, ischemia, anoxia, progressive subcortical gliosis, Rett syndrome, porphyria and carbon monoxide poisoning, among others.

It is rare for humans to manifest all of the identified symptoms of the syndrome; three or more are required for diagnosis. Among humans, the most common symptoms include placidity, hyperorality and dietary changes. They may also present with an inability to recognize objects or inability to recognize faces or other memory disorders. Social neurosciences research shows that changes in temporal lobe is identified as a cause for aberrant sexual and hyper-sexual behaviors.

In children 
Klüver–Bucy syndrome has been shown to occur more in adults than in children. In children certain conditions such as herpes simplex encephalitis has the potential to manifest the syndrome. Children exhibit many of the same symptoms as adults with Klüver–Bucy syndrome, however they display these symptoms in different ways than adults. Hypersexualtity, as a symptom of Klüver–Bucy syndrome, in children is characterized by "frequent touching of genitals, intermittent pelvic thrusting movements, and rubbing of genitals on the bed while lying prone". Observations of hypersexuality in children were recorded  from children primarily under the age of 4.  It is thought that since these behaviors have yet to be learned by children that they display themselves in more ambiguous ways. The underlying conditions that lead to Klüver–Bucy syndrome can have an effect on the pattern of symptoms observed.

Treatment/management 
Treatment for Klüver–Bucy syndrome focuses on controlling the present symptoms because no current intervention will cure the condition. Medications used to treat the symptoms include carbamazepines and leuprolide, which help reduce sexual behavior associated with Klüver–Bucy syndrome. For carbamazepines it has been shown to have the greatest effect when treating traumatic brain injury-derived Klüver–Bucy syndrome. Other medications commonly utilized are mood stabilizers, antidepressants, and various antipsychotic drugs.

In popular culture
Klüver–Bucy syndrome was featured in the Radiolab episode, "Blame". The lead story featured a man who developed Klüver–Bucy syndrome after his second neurosurgery for epilepsy. The story was revisited by Radiolab in June 2017 (following parodious homage in Mac's turn when "The Gang Gets Analyzed" in season 8, episode 5 of It's Always Sunny In Philadelphia), augmented with further discussion with neurologist Dr. Sapolsky, who addresses the syndrome and the associated legal significance of neurological defenses.  Klüver–Bucy syndrome was featured in the Black Box episode, "The Fear", the episode "Taboo" of the TV series Criminal Minds, the episode "Whistleblowers" of the TV series Blue Bloods, and the episode "Comfort's Overrated" of the TV series Royal Pains.

See also
 Frontal lobe disorder
 Lawrence Weiskrantz
 Urbach–Wiethe disease

References

Sources

External links 

 The National Institute of Neurological Disorders and Stroke – Kluver-Bucy Syndrome
 Anatomic Basis of Klüver-Bucy Syndrome
 Monkeys With Amygdala Lesions
 Six distinct case studies of KBS in India

Sexual arousal
Syndromes affecting the nervous system
Amygdala
Psychopathological syndromes
Rare syndromes